The 2022 Tour de Romandie Féminin is a women's road cycling stage race that was held in Switzerland from 7 to 9 October 2022. It was the first edition of the Tour de Romandie Féminin and was the twenty-third event on the 2022 UCI Women's World Tour calendar. The race was held as part of the celebrations of 75 years of the Tour de Romandie.

Teams 
11 of 14 UCI Women's WorldTeams, three UCI Women's Continental Teams and the Swiss national team made up the fifteen teams that participated in the race.

UCI Women's WorldTeams

 
 
 
 
 
 
 
 
 
 
 

UCI Women's Continental Teams

 
 
 
 

National Teams

 Switzerland

Route 
The first stage was a circuit race in Lausanne, the second stage was from Sion to the ski resort of Thyon 2000 and the final stage was from Fribourg to Geneva - where the first men's Tour de Romandie  ended in 1947.

Stages

Stage 1 
7 October 2022 — Lausanne to Lausanne,

Stage 2 
8 October 2022 — Sion to Thyon 2000,

Stage 3 
9 October 2022 — Fribourg to Geneva,

See also 
 2022 in women's road cycling

References

External links 
 

2022 UCI Women's World Tour
2022
2022 in Swiss sport